The 2011 Premier League Asia Trophy was the fifth edition of the Premier League Asia Trophy. Chelsea, Aston Villa, Blackburn Rovers and Hong Kong club Kitchee competed for the title on 27 July 2011 and 30 July 2011 in Hong Kong Stadium. The winners were Chelsea, beating Aston Villa 2–0 in the final.

Results

Semifinals 

All kick-off times are local (UTC+08:00).

Third-place playoff

Final

Ticket sales
Ticket prices for each match day in Hong Kong dollars (with all British prices an approximation) were: $130 (£10), $210 (£16.50), $270 (£21), $330 (£26), $460 (£36).

Ticket sales started from 1 June 2011 at Hong Kong Football Association and online at www.cityline.com. More than two thirds of the 80,000 tickets available were purchased by Hong Kong football fans after just five days.

Goalscorers
1 goal

 Mauro Formica
 Darren Bent
 Frank Lampard
 Daniel Sturridge
 David Dunn
 Nick Blackman
 Josh McEachran
 Didier Drogba
 Fernando Torres

1 own goal

 Ubay Luzardo

References

External links 
 The Barclays Asia Trophy Facebook page

Premier League Asia Trophy
Prem
2011
Asia Trophy